Syburi (meaning "City of the Banyan") is the name for the Malay state of Kedah returned to Thailand when the Japanese occupied British Malaya during World War II.

History

General Plaek Phibunsongkhram signed a secret agreement with the Japanese Empire on 14 December 1941 and  committed the Thai armed forces to participate in the planned Malayan Campaign and Burma Campaign. An alliance between Thailand and Japan was formally signed on 21 December 1941. On 25 January 1942, the Thai government,  believing the Allies beaten, declared war on the United States and the United Kingdom. As a reward for entering into a military alliance with the Japanese, the latter agreed to return to Thailand the four Malayan provinces ceded to the British in 1909, Kedah, Perlis, Kelantan, and Terengganu, as well as parts of Shan State in British Burma.
In July 1943, Japanese Prime Minister Hideki Tojo announced that Kedah (along with Perlis, Kelantan and Terengganu) were to be returned to Thailand as part of the military alliance signed between Thailand and Japan on 21 December 1941. 

From 18 October 1943 until the surrender of the Japanese at the end of the war, Kelantan, Terengganu, Kedah and Perlis were under Thai administration. On 2 September 1945, Kedah and the three other states were returned to the British.

People from Syburi have interacted with people from Phuket and Nakhon Si Thammarat and the result has been a number of marriages between Buddhists and Muslims.
People born in Saiburi are considered subjects of the King of Thailand. People who were born there and are now living in the state of Kedah are permitted to purchase land and live in Thailand even though technically, they are now living in a Malaysian state.

Administration
Administrative services were carried out by Thai civil servants who were under military supervision. The Japanese authorities retained a great degree of control.

Japanese Governors 
1941 - Mar 1942            Ojama 
Mar 1942 - Oct 1943        Sukegawa Seiji (Seichi)

Thai Military Commissioner
Oct 1943 - 1945?           Pramote Chong Charoen

Thai General-Commissioners 
Administering Kedah, Kelantan and Terengganu: 
20 Aug 1943 - Oct 1943     Kamol Saraphaisariddhikan Chotikasathion 
Oct 1943 - 1945?           Chierlah Kamol Sribhaasairadhikavan Josikasarthien

Documents

See also
Japanese occupation of Malaya
Anglo-Siamese Treaty of 1909
Burney Treaty
 Thailand in World War II

References

External links
Saiburi Samuk

History of Kedah
Social history of Malaysia
Military history of Thailand
Former countries in Malaysian history
States and territories established in 1943
Former provinces of Thailand
British Malaya in World War II
1940s in Thailand